Don Gordon (born April 17, 1948) is a Canadian former professional ice hockey winger who played 94 games in the World Hockey Association. He played with the Chicago Cougars and Los Angeles Sharks.

References 

1948 births
Canadian ice hockey right wingers
Chicago Cougars players
Greensboro Generals (SHL) players
Living people
Los Angeles Sharks players
Ice hockey people from Ontario
Sportspeople from Timmins
20th-century Canadian people